Mike Trautmann (born 13 March 1974) is a retired German race walker.

Achievements

References

1974 births
Living people
German male racewalkers
Athletes (track and field) at the 2000 Summer Olympics
Olympic athletes of Germany